Mihail Milchev (born 18 June 1988) is a Bulgarian footballer who plays as a defender for Partizan Cherven Bryag.

Career
On 8 June 2018, Milchev joined Botev Vratsa.

On 24 June 2019, Milchev signed with Dunav Ruse.

References

External links

1988 births
Living people
Bulgarian footballers
FC Botev Krivodol players
PFC Spartak Pleven players
PFC Slavia Sofia players
FC Dunav Ruse players
FC Botev Vratsa players
FC Vitosha Bistritsa players
First Professional Football League (Bulgaria) players
Second Professional Football League (Bulgaria) players
Association football defenders